Christian Jean Gourcuff (born 5 April 1955) is a French professional football manager and former player who was most recently the manager of Ligue 1 club Nantes.

Club career
During his playing career, Gourcuff played for Rennais, US Berné, Guingamp, Rouen, La Chaux-de-Fonds, Lorient, Le Mans and Montreal Supra.

International career 
Gourcuff played one match for the Brittany national team in 1988. It was an indoor game against the United States, and the final score was 6–2 in favor of Brittany.

Managerial career
Becoming a player-manager at the age of 27, Gourcuff coached Lorient, Le Mans, Pont-L'Abbé, Stade Rennais and Al-Ittihad, and is considered in France as a shrewd tactician with a strong commitment to attacking football and an eye for young talent. Gourcuff is thus widely credited with having overseen the progress of youngsters such as Jérémy Morel, André-Pierre Gignac, Kevin Gameiro, Morgan Amalfitano, Michael Ciani, Christophe Jallet, Laurent Koscielny, Bruno Ecuele Manga and Lamine Koné. From 1989 onward, Gourcuff exclusively focused on management after retiring from playing at the age of 34. Gourcuff has spent a total of 25 years in charge of Lorient in three different spells ranging between 1982 and 2014.

Algeria
On 4 August 2014, Gourcuff was officially unveiled as the new head coach of the Algeria national football team, taking over the vacant spot left by the departure of Vahid Halilhodžić.
On 3 February 2015, Gourcuff was given a new deal despite Algeria's quarter-final exit at the Africa Cup of Nations.

Personal life
His son, Yoann, is also a professional footballer who represented France at the 2010 FIFA World Cup.

Managerial statistics

Honours
Orders
Chevalier of the Légion d'honneur: 2013

References

1955 births
Living people
Sportspeople from Finistère
Sportspeople from Brest, France
Footballers from Brittany
Association football midfielders
French footballers
French expatriate footballers
Stade Rennais F.C. players
En Avant Guingamp players
FC Rouen players
FC Lorient players
Le Mans FC players
Ligue 2 players
French football managers
Montreal Supra players
FC Lorient managers
Stade Rennais F.C. managers
Le Mans FC managers
Al-Gharafa SC managers
FC Nantes managers
Algeria national football team managers
Ligue 1 managers
Ligue 2 managers
French expatriate sportspeople in Canada
Expatriate soccer players in Canada
Canadian Soccer League (1987–1992) players
2015 Africa Cup of Nations managers
University of Western Brittany alumni
French expatriate football managers
French expatriate sportspeople in Qatar
Expatriate football managers in Qatar
French expatriate sportspeople in Algeria
Expatriate football managers in Algeria
Chevaliers of the Légion d'honneur
Brittany international footballers